Sibylla (1159 – 25 July 1190) was Queen of Jerusalem from 1186 to 1190. She reigned alongside her husband Guy of Lusignan, to whom she was unwaveringly attached despite his unpopularity among the barons of the Kingdom of Jerusalem.

Sibylla was the eldest daughter of King Amalric and the only daughter of Agnes of Courtenay. Her father died in 1174, making her heir presumptive to her younger brother, King Baldwin IV. When it became clear that 13-year-old Baldwin had contracted leprosy, the matter of Sibylla's marriage became urgent. The regent, Count Raymond III of Tripoli, arranged for her to marry William Longsword of Montferrat in late 1176, but William left her a pregnant widow, and in possession of the County of Jaffa and Ascalon, in 1177.

Shortly after giving birth to a son, Baldwin, Sibylla came to be associated with her brother in public acts, thereby being designated as next in line to the throne. Sibylla's second marriage, to Guy of Lusignan, was arranged in 1180 by her brother likely to foil a coup planned by Raymond, but it deeply divided the nobility. By 1183, King Baldwin had become completely disabled as well as disillusioned with Guy's character and ability to lead. In order to prevent Guy's accession to the throne, he had Sibylla's son crowned as co-king and attempted to separate Sibylla from Guy, but she refused.

Sibylla's brother, Baldwin IV, died in 1185, having named Raymond to rule as regent for Baldwin V instead of Sibylla or Guy. The boy king died the next year, and Sibylla moved quickly to claim the throne against Raymond's ambitions. She agreed to her supporters' demand to set Guy aside on the condition that she could choose her next husband. At her coronation in mid-September 1186, she outwitted her supporters by choosing Guy and crowning him herself. Saladin took advantage of the discord in the kingdom to invade in 1187, reducing the Kingdom of Jerusalem to a single city, Tyre. Sibylla visited her husband, who had been taken captive at the decisive Battle of Hattin, and procured from Saladin his release. She died, along with their daughters, of an epidemic outside Acre while Guy was besieging it.

Childhood
Sibylla was the elder of the two children of the count of Jaffa and Ascalon, Amalric, and his first wife, Agnes of Courtenay. She was born between 1157, when her parents married, and 1161, when her brother, Baldwin, was born. On her father's side, Sibylla was the niece of the then-reigning King Baldwin III and granddaughter of Queen Melisende. The ruling class of the Kingdom of Jerusalem and other crusader states, called the Franks, were French-speaking Catholics who had arrived in the Levant from Western Europe and remained Western in culture. Sibylla was named after her father's half-sister, Sibylla of Anjou.

When King Baldwin III died in 1163, the High Court forced Amalric to agree to an annulment of his marriage to Agnes in order to be accepted as the new king. He succeeded in having his and Agnes's children declared legitimate by Pope Alexander III. In common with Western practices, Sibylla was educated by the king's aunt Abbess Ioveta, Queen Melisende's youngest sister, at the Convent of Saint Lazarus near Jerusalem. She consequently had little contact with her mother or brother, who was heir apparent to their father. With his second wife, Maria Komnene, the king had two daughters, of whom Isabella survived infancy.

King Amalric feared that, like his brother and their father, King Fulk, he too would die young, before his heir reached the age of majority. Having no close male relative who could rule as regent on his son's behalf if the latter ascended as a minor, Amalric authorized the archbishop of Tyre, Frederick de la Roche, in 1169 to find a husband for Sibylla in Western Europe. The candidate had to be an older man of high-enough rank and with enough experience in government. Amalric chose Count Stephen I of Sancerre, the brother-in-law of King Louis VII of France and relative of the English royal house. Stephen thus came to Jerusalem in 1171. Sibylla's brother was suspected of having contracted leprosy, then an incurable disease that would prevent him from marrying and having children, and Amalric may have seen Sibylla and Stephen as eventual monarchs. Stephen rejected the match, however, for unknown reasons.

Heir presumptive

When King Amalric died of dysentery in July 1174, the High Court met to discuss who should succeed him. Sibylla's 13-year-old brother, Baldwin, would have been the obvious successor had there not been for fears of his incipient leprosy. The only serious alternative to him was Sibylla, then aged about 15. Female succession had been grounded in recent law and had precedent, as Amalric's mother, Melisende, preceded her sons on the throne. But unlike her grandmother, Sibylla was young, inexperienced, and unmarried. No bachelor in the Latin East was fit to marry her; Count Raymond III of Tripoli and Baldwin of Antioch were too closely related, and a marriage to one of the barons in the kingdom could have caused resentment among the others. A match had to be found abroad, but that would have taken too long. Baldwin IV was therefore chosen, with the expectation that a husband would be found for Sibylla to succeed him if he proved to be affected during his minority.

Marriage
Count Raymond of Tripoli, who was by then also prince of Galilee in the Kingdom of Jerusalem, became regent for the young king due to being the nearest male relative. He allowed Sibylla and Baldwin's mother, Agnes, to return to court. The siblings came to be strongly influenced by their mother in the following years. Baldwin's condition deteriorated rapidly after his accession, and there was no longer any doubt that he was affected by leprosy. A brother-in-law was quickly sought. The groom chosen by Raymond and the High Court was William Longsword, son of Marquis William V of Montferrat and cousin of both Holy Roman Emperor Frederick Barbarossa and King Louis VII of France.

By the time William arrived in the East in October 1176, the barons of the Kingdom of Jerusalem were no longer so well disposed towards him, likely because Emperor Frederick had suffered military setbacks against the Lombard League and could no longer be expected to aid Catholics in the East. But the marriage had to go forward because if she were to be jilted again, Sibylla's marriage prospects could irreparably diminish. The couple married in November, and he was granted the County of Jaffa and Ascalon. Sibylla was the only countess in the kingdom beside her mother, who had been granted the title after the annulment of the royal marriage, which conferred a certain distinction. Baldwin may have offered to abdicate in William's favour, but William would have declined because he knew he lacked support among the nobility.

Countess

Around April 1177, shortly after he and Sibylla conceived a child, William fell critically ill. He died in June, by which time her pregnancy was known. Sibylla was left as the suo jure countess of Jaffa and Ascalon. Sibylla and Baldwin's first cousin Count Philip I of Flanders arrived in Jerusalem soon after, but declined regency when Baldwin offered it to him. Philip's only goal was to arrange for Sibylla and her half-sister Isabella to marry Robert and William, respectively, sons of his favourite liegeman Robert V of Béthune. The High Court countered that custom entitled the widowed Sibylla to a year of mourning, which was especially seemly given her pregnancy. Philip and the High Court could not agree on which of them had the final say in choosing Sibylla's next husband. The opposition to Philip was led by the lord of Ramla, Baldwin of Ibelin, who hoped to be the chosen suitor.

Sibylla gave birth to a son, named Baldwin in honour of her brother, in the winter of 1177–78. Her mourning period ended in June 1178, and it became appropriate to negotiate a new marriage. Baldwin of Ibelin's suit having been rejected, his brother Balian was allowed to marry Queen Maria, stepmother of Sibylla and the King. On 1 July 1178, Sibylla began to be associated with her brother in public acts, reminiscent of Melisende's association with her father, King Baldwin II. Baldwin IV thus confirmed Sibylla's status as his heir presumptive.

The High Court agreed unanimously that Sibylla should next marry Duke Hugh III of Burgundy. The king so desperately needed a brother-in-law that he wrote to the king of France, empowering him to choose an alternative candidate if Hugh refused. Hugh intended to sail to the East in early 1180 and marry Sibylla at Easter. A group of crusaders from France, led by Count Henry I of Champagne, Peter I of Courtenay, and Philip of Dreux, arrived in July 1179. They failed to prevent the Egyptian ruler Saladin from destroying the crusader fortress of Le Chastellet, but remained in the kingdom in the hopes of assisting at Sibylla and Hugh's coronation the following year.

Remarriage

Things took an unexpected turn during the Holy Week in 1180. The brewing conflict in France that followed the accession of King Philip II prevented Hugh from leaving his domain. Contemporary chroniclers Ernoul and William of Tyre relate the events differently. According to Ernoul, Sibylla wrote to Baldwin of Ibelin when he was in Saladin's captivity, promising that she would persuade her brother to allow their marriage if he could ransom himself, but was persuaded by her mother to marry Guy of Lusignan, a Poitevin knight, instead. Historian Bernard Hamilton argues that Ernoul's account, though accepted in older historiography, is biased in favour of the Ibelins.

William of Tyre reports that during the Holy Week in 1180 Count Raymond III of Tripoli and Prince Bohemond III of Antioch were marching towards Jerusalem to stage a coup against King Baldwin. Hamilton concludes that their intention was to force the king to have Sibylla marry Baldwin of Ibelin and to then abdicate, and that the king foiled their plan by arranging her marriage to Guy. Baldwin of Ibelin had never been approved by Sibylla's brother, possibly because his family had only recently risen to lordly rank. Another factor was that Saladin had been informed by Raymond and Bohemond's conspiracy to enthrone Baldwin and therefore set Baldwin's ransom to that of a king; a successor with such a debt was not desirable.

From 1180, Sibylla held Jaffa and Ascalon with Guy, and had four daughters with him. Their marriage divided the nobility into a faction supporting Guy (Sibylla; the king; their mother, Agnes; their stepfather the lord of Sidon, Raynald; their maternal uncle, Joscelin of Courtenay; and the lord of Oultrejordain, Raynald of Châtillon) and a faction opposing him (Sibylla's paternal kinsmen Bohemond of Antioch and Raymond of Tripoli; Baldwin and Balian of Ibelin; and her stepmother, Maria Komnene). In order to prevent the opposing party from setting up a rival claimant, the king took his mother's advice and, in October 1180, betrothed his half-sister Isabella, Maria's daughter and Balian's stepdaughter, to Humphrey IV of Toron, stepson of Raynald of Châtillon. From March 1181, both Sibylla and Guy were associated with King Baldwin in public acts.

Disinheritance
Baldwin IV's leprosy progressed quickly; in 1183 he lost his sight and could no longer walk unsupported or use his hands. Having developed a life-threatening fever, the king summoned the High Court in June and made Guy regent. Baldwin retained only the royal title and the city of Jerusalem. But Guy proved far too unpopular to be an effective military leader, and gravely insulted the incapacitated king by refusing to exchange Jerusalem for Tyre.

Saladin attacked Kerak Castle in late 1183 while the wedding of Sibylla's half-sister Isabella to Humphrey of Toron was celebrated. Baldwin summoned his troops. Not trusting him to efficiently command the army, the king deprived Guy of regency and, effectively, of his place in the line of succession. The succession was then deliberated by the assembled nobility, which included Guy, Agnes, Bohemond of Antioch, Raymond of Tripoli, Raynald of Sidon, and the Ibelin brothers, but not Sibylla's supporters Raynald of Châtillon and Joscelin of Courtenay. Eventually Agnes's proposal that Sibylla's five-year-old son, Baldwin V, be crowned co-king was accepted because his was the next strongest claim after Sibylla's. The coronation took place on 20 November, and the boy received the homage of all the barons except his stepfather. Baldwin IV and his army then relieved the siege of Kerak.

The question of who would rule the kingdom as regent for Baldwin V troubled the disabled king. Sibylla and Guy would have the best claim to regency if Baldwin IV died. Her brother knew that this could only be prevented by having their marriage annulled and discussed the matter with the Latin patriarch of Jerusalem, Heraclius. Baldwin failed to take into account Sibylla's steadfast devotion to Guy as well as Guy's friendship with Heraclius, who may have warned the count about Baldwin's intentions. Instead of going to Jerusalem with the rest of the army after lifting the siege of Kerak, Guy went straight to Ascalon and sent a message to Sibylla, who joined him there. The annulment could not proceed without their presence, and the couple's refusal to leave Ascalon despite the king's summons frustrated the scheme to separate them. Baldwin next attempted to confiscate Jaffa and Ascalon, but only succeeded in revoking Jaffa.

On Baldwin IV's deathbed in early 1185, the right to rule the kingdom as regent in the name of Baldwin V, then a sickly child, was offered to the count of Tripoli. Raymond and his party were determined to prevent Sibylla and Guy's accession, and he accepted the regency on the condition that the pope should, on the advice of the Holy Roman emperor and the kings of England and France, decide whether the crown should pass to Sibylla or Isabella in case of Baldwin V's premature death. The High Court accepted the conditions and swore an oath to him in the presence of Baldwin IV. Guardianship of the boy was awarded to his granduncle Joscelin of Courtenay. Baldwin IV died in March 1185 or before 16 May 1185 at the latest, when Sibylla's son, Baldwin V, is recorded as the sole king. Baldwin V's paternal grandfather, Marquis William V of Montferrat, arrived in Jerusalem to safeguard the young king's rights.

Reign

Accession

Sibylla's son died in Acre in August 1186. Her mother had died by then too. Raymond summoned the High Court to Nablus. It was attended by half-sister Isabella; Isabella's husband Humphrey and her stepfamily, the Ibelins; and likely by Raymond's stepsons. Contemporaries believed that Raymond intended to claim the throne for himself. Meanwhile, Sibylla's uncle Joscelin of Courtenay took possession of Acre and Beirut in her name. Sybilla hurried to Jerusalem to attend her son's funeral. She and Guy garrisoned the city with their strong armed escort.

The count of Tripoli underestimated the support for Sibylla. The lord of Oultrejordain and her father-in-law the marquess of Montferrat came to Sybilla's side. She was also backed by the patriarch and the master of the Knights Templar, Gerard of Ridefort, who both resided in Jerusalem, as well as by the constable, Guy's brother Aimery; the chancellor, Peter of Lydda; and the seneschal, her uncle Joscelin. The nobility and clergy assembled in Jerusalem wished to settle the succession immediately. They concurred that Sibylla had the best claim, but disagreed on whether Guy should become king alongside her. In the end, Sibylla's supporters required her to give up Guy in return for their recognition of her rights. Sibylla acquiesced on three conditions: legitimisation of her daughters by Guy, Guy's retention of Jaffa and Ascalon, and ability to personally choose her next husband. The conditions were accepted.

Coronation

On the advice of Heraclius and Gerard, Sibylla sent an invitation to the nobles at Nablus to attend her coronation. Possibly in an attempt to appease Raymond and his party, Guy was not mentioned in it; Sibylla proclaimed that the kingdom had passed to her by right of inheritance. They nevertheless refused to attend, arguing that doing so would violate the oaths taken at Baldwin IV's deathbed, and went so far as to send a delegation of monks to forbid the coronation. The master of the Knights Hospitaller, Roger des Moulins, also declined to be present, more likely due to the oath than out of any opposition to Sibylla. He was nevertheless persuaded to surrender his key to the chest containing regalia. The city gates were barred ahead of the coronation to prevent disruption by the opposing party, and instead of by the attendees, Sibylla was acclaimed queen by the citizens of Jerusalem at the urging of Raynald of Châtillon.

As was traditional, the coronation was held at the Church of the Holy Sepulchre, likely in mid-September. After crowning her, the patriarch gave a second crown to Sibylla and asked her to choose a new consort. She astonished the attendees by calling forth Guy and placing the crown on his head. Having agreed that she should choose a husband after setting Guy aside, they could raise no objection to her choice. Upon hearing about this turn of events, Raymond proposed crowning Isabella and Humphrey as rival monarchs, but Humphrey sneaked out of Nablus at night and rode to Jerusalem. Upon arrival, he demanded an audience with the queen, who agreed after initial reluctance. He swore fealty to her, and she took him to see Guy, to whom he paid homage. Roger des Moulins and Heraclius mediated peace, and all the barons except Raymond of Tripoli and Baldwin of Ibelin came to Jerusalem to submit.

Fall of Jerusalem
Sibylla was well-positioned to wield power because Guy's authority was entirely dependent on her. She was associated with her husband in public acts in the first months of their reign, but this was cut short by Saladin's invasion. In an act of continued defiance, Raymond had retired to his fief of Galilee, allied with Saladin, and garrisoned Tiberias with Muslim troops. The sultan attacked the kingdom on 26 April 1187. After Muslim troops annihilated the combined armies of the Templars and the Hospitallers at Cresson near Nazareth on 1 May, Raymond was forced by his own vassals to submit to Guy. Though now unified, the kingdom had been critically weakened by the defeat at Cresson. The Christian army led by Guy suffered a crushing defeat at the Horns of Hattin on 4 July. The king was taken prisoner; Raynald was executed; and Raymond died of an illness in Tripoli in September.

At the time of King Guy's defeat and imprisonment at Hattin, Queen Sibylla was in Jerusalem. The queen went to Ascalon with her daughters to defend the city and only surrendered it to Saladin in return for Guy's release, but the sultan nevertheless kept him imprisoned. In September, Saladin besieged Jerusalem. The queen commanded the defence with the assistance of Patriarch Heraclius and Balian of Ibelin, but intense bombardment forced them to surrender. Saladin allowed the defeated to ransom themselves, and Sibylla was further permitted to visit Guy in Nablus while she travelled to Antioch. She was apparently prevented from embarking there for Europe when her ship was seized by Conrad of Montferrat, her first husband's brother who had taken up the defence of Tyre. Sibylla instead joined her stepmother, Queen Maria, in Tripoli. In the months following the Battle of Hattin, all of the kingdom except Tyre fell to Saladin.

Sibylla repeatedly pleaded with Saladin for Guy's release, and the sultan granted her request in July 1188. The couple reunited on the island of Arwad near Tortosa, from where they went north to Antioch and then back south to Tripoli, gathering an army along the way. They marched to Tyre in April 1189. The city's defender, Conrad, refused to allow the king and queen into the city, forcing them to spend months outside its walls. Conrad posited that Guy had forfeited the kingdom at Hattin and that Tyre was being held in trust for the Holy Roman emperor and the kings of England and France, who would decide to whom the government should be assigned.

Death
The Third Crusade was launched in 1189, and Sibylla accompanied Guy to the siege of Acre along with Humphrey, Isabella, Maria, and Balian. An epidemic struck the crusaders' camp in 1190. Sibylla died on 25 July, a few days after her remaining daughters, Alice and Maria. The Itinerarium recorded accusations of foul play against Guy, but in truth their deaths deprived Guy of any right to the throne. Sibylla's heir was her half-sister Isabella I.

Assessment
Historian Bernard Hamilton disagrees with Ernoul's characterization of Sibylla as fickle, foolish, and sentimental, arguing that the portrayal "bears little relation to the known facts". Influenced by the prevailing medieval perception of ideal queenship, Sibylla's contemporaries and near-contemporaneous chroniclers were interested more in her relationship with Guy than in her military activity. Standing by her husband won her approval of her contemporaries; Roger of Wendover described her as:

Due to the distortion of her image by contemporary gender ideals, resourcefulness and loyalty remain Sibylla's chief traits in modern historiography.

See also
Kingdom of Heaven – film portraying Sibylla as an orientalized princess who loves Balian rather than Guy

References

Bibliography

 
 
 
 
 

|-

1160s births
1190 deaths
12th-century kings of Jerusalem
Counts of Jaffa and Ascalon
French noble families
Queens regnant of Jerusalem
Women in 12th-century warfare
12th-century women rulers
Women in war in the Middle East